Grinder was a late 1980s/early 1990s speed metal/thrash metal band from Germany. They released three full-length albums and one EP before disbanding. Grinder was the first international heavy metal act to play in Turkey, on May 12, 1990, at the Open Air Theater in Istanbul.

Members 
 Adrian Hahn – vocals (plus bass guitar on first three albums)
 Andy – lead guitar
 Lario – rhythm guitar
 Andi – bass guitar
 Stefan Arnold – drums (played in Grave Digger afterwards)

Discography 
 Dawn for the Living (1988, No Remorse)
 Dead End (1989, No Remorse)
 The 1st EP (1990, No Remorse)
 Nothing Is Sacred (1991, Noise)

References

External links 
 
 http://www.bnrmetal.com/v3/band/band/Grin
 Andy Ergun, Interview: "We Were An Original Band" January 5, 2012

German thrash metal musical groups
German speed metal musical groups